Park Rehyun (1920–1976) was a Korean painter. She is regarded as a pioneer of modern Korean art during the late Japanese Colonial period and the following decades.

Biography 
Park was born in the city of Jinnampo in South Korea's South Pyongan Province. Graduating from Gyeongseong high school in 1937, she entered the Tokyo Women's School of Fine Arts in 1941.

Park married a celebrated artist, Kim Ki-chang, in 1946 with whom she presented exhibitions and private showcases. Her works sought to use oriental materials to provide for western-style artwork. This method resulted in sensual hues and fine imaging. A pioneering woman painter, she rejected prejudices against women and completed her own paintings with passion.

Her youngest daughter, who is a nun in South Korea, said in an interview that she had spent her life as a good mother, as well as a committed painter and wife. She was said to have influenced her husband during her life.

In 1976, Park died of liver cancer at her residence in Seongbuk District, Seoul.

Works 
She made her debut by being accepted to the Chosen Art exhibition of the Governor-General of Korea in 1943. Later, she was awarded the first prize given by the President of the Republic of Korea and grand prize in the National Art exhibition of Korea, gaining her wider attention.

She participated in domestic art exhibitions until the early 1960s and then flew to São Paulo Biennale as an official South Korean delegate. After finishing her work, she visited several nations in Latin America, including Mexico, then studied tapestry and printmaking in New York City.

Briefly, her works can be separated into 4 time periods. The first (1940s) concentrated on Japanese paintings and figure paintings. The second (1950s) challenged her own work with traditional materials of oriental painting in a western-drawing manner; her pieces at this time produced half-abstract paintings by interpreting cubism and partition of the canvas in an analytic method. The third phase (1960s) began experimenting abstractionism, and the fourth period (1970s) made use of printmaking skills in creative drawing.

Notes 
 韓國現代作家十人(吳光洙, 悅話堂, 1977)
 雨鄕 朴崍賢(庚美文化社, 1978)

References 

1920 births
1976 deaths
South Korean painters
People from Nampo
South Korean women
Deaths from liver cancer
20th-century Korean painters
South Korean women artists
20th-century women artists